The Jonchon mine(전천탄광) is a coal mine in North Korea. The mine is located in Jonchon county in Chagang Province.

References 

Coal mines in North Korea